Sparna macilenta is a species of beetle in the family Cerambycidae. It was described by Pascoe in 1888. It is known from Ecuador and Colombia.

References

Colobotheini
Beetles described in 1888